Territorial Assembly elections were held in French Cameroon on 23 December 1956. The result was a victory for the Cameroonian Union, which won 30 of the 70 seats in the Territorial Assembly. Voter turnout was 41.4%.

Results

References

Cameroon
1956 in French Cameroon
Elections in Cameroon
French Cameroon
Election and referendum articles with incomplete results